Vesper (released in France as Vesper Chronicles) is a 2022 science fiction film directed by Kristina Buožytė and Bruno Samper, starring Raffiella Chapman, Eddie Marsan, Rosy McEwen and Richard Brake. Set in a bleak post-apocalyptic Earth, it follows a 13-year old girl skilled in biohacking. It was selected to compete at the 2022 Karlovy Vary International Film Festival.

Plot 
Humanity tried to prevent the impending ecological crisis by investing massively in genetic technology. It failed. Engineered viruses and organisms escaped into the wild. They wiped out edible plants, animals and large populations of humans. An oligarchy now thrives in enclosed cities called 'citadels' while everyone else struggles to survive. For food, people rely on seeds traded by the citadels. However, these are coded to produce only one harvest.

The people outside of the citadel must find food and resources on their own. The citadel gives them modified seeds that require a special process to be made fertile. Only the scientists of the citadels know the details of this process.

Vesper is a 13-year old girl who lives in a house in the forest with her father Darius who is paralyzed. Darius can only communicate by using a drone that looks like a floating robot head. He uses the drone to accompany Vesper in her daily routine while his real body stays in bed. A year ago Vesper’s mother left to be part of a group of people called The Pilgrims. They are scavengers and drag the junk they collect. Vesper’s uncle Jonas lives not far away. He manages a sort of orphanage that he uses to extract blood from the children and sell it to the citadel. Jonas also owns beings called Jugs, artificial humans made with the sole purpose of being a slave-work force.

One day a citadel ship crashes nearby and Vesper finds a young woman survivor, Camellia. Vesper takes her home and heals her wounds. Camellia promises to take Vesper and her father to the citadel if they can find the other passenger of the ship, a man named Elias. However, when Vesper goes to check she finds that Jonas is also there. Jonas kills Elias and suspects that there was another passenger on the ship.

Vesper tries to communicate with the citadel so that they can come and pick up Camellia but the only transmitter is with Jonas. When Vesper reveals to Camellia that Elias is dead, the woman mourns him deeply. Vesper realizes that Camellia isn’t human, she is a very advanced Jug, one who looks exactly like a human and has emotions. Elias is her creator, but making a sentient Jug is a crime, and so he and Camellia needed to escape.

Vesper uses the seeds stolen from her uncle Jonas' farm for an experiment involving samples from the synthetic Camellia. Camellia plays a tune from a musical instrument that causes the “locked” bacteria in the seeds to unlock. Vesper assumes she found a way to “unlock” the Citadel seeds and make them fertile so they will never starve again. 

Jonas comes to the house and finds out about Camellia. Vesper and Camellia manage to overpower him. Vesper makes a deal: If he leaves them alone he can have the seeds and enough food. Jonas goes back to his place and calls the citadel, revealing to them about Camellia. Soldiers from the citadel arrive and kill Jonas before going to Vesper’s house.

Camellia and Vesper run while Darius stays behind and holds off the soldiers by blowing up the house’s reactor. Camellia leaves Vesper unconscious and allows the soldiers to take her. Before that, she tells Vesper that she has the seeds and that she can change the world with them.

Deeply saddened, Vesper buries the altered seeds, believing there’s no use for them in a world without her loved ones. But when a group of Jonas’ kids find her, Vesper changes her mind. Vesper and the children journey to a makeshift tower built by the Pilgrims. There she finally takes the seeds out and lets the wind spread them.

Cast 
 Raffiella Chapman as Vesper, a 13-year old girl living alone with her father; she demonstrates great aptitude at bio-hacking and tries to help Camellia after rescuing her.
 Eddie Marsan as Jonas, Vesper's uncle, who is the brutal leader of a nearby group of survivors.
 Rosy McEwen as Camellia, a Citadel citizen whose ship crashed in the forest before being rescued by Vesper.
 Richard Brake as Darius, Vesper's father and Jonas' brother, paralyzed but always following her via a talking drone.
 Melanie Gaydos as Jug, a genetically created human being devoid of intelligence, used as slave labor in Jonas' camp.
 Edmund Dehn as Elias, Camellia's father, who is head scientist at the nearest Citadel.
 Matvej Buravkov as Boz
 Marijus Demiskis as Med
 Markas Eimontas as Mo
 Titas Rukas as Beck
 Markas Sagaitis as Fitz

Production 
The film has been six years in the making for directors/writers Kristina Buožytė and Bruno Samper, who had already collaborated together on Vanishing Waves in 2012. They chose to shoot it in English to broaden its appeal.

It was shot in Vilnius, Lithuania, mostly outdoors except the scenes inside Vesper's house, which were shot in a studio.
Location scouting in Lithuania proved difficult, as there was two meters of snow, so the crew had to imagine how locations would look once the snow had melted. It was still snowing two weeks before the beginning of the shoot, and at that point, no location had been confirmed, so they decided on locations during shooting.

Cinematographer Feliksas Abrukauskas was inspired by paintings from Johannes Vermeer and Rembrandt for the light.

While visual effects are present in the film, they are mostly to enhance a shot with a plant or a ship, as no scene was shot against a green screen. Vesper's flying drone is either CGI or a real drone, depending on the shots, as the real drone was very loud and actors could not concentrate on their lines when it was flying.

Release 
Vesper debuted at the 2022 Karlovy Vary International Film Festival on 2 July 2022. The film opened in French theatres on 18 August 2022. It was released in the United States, Lithuania and Turkey on 30 September 2022, and in Germany and Singapore on 6 October 2022.

Reception

Box office
, Vesper has grossed $49,493 in the United States, and $1.5 million in other territories, including $889,529 from France and $414,985 from Russia, for a worldwide total of $1.576 million.

In France, Vesper sold 13,352 tickets on its first day, earning a fifth place, for 303 copies, behind Where the Crawdads Sing.
During its first week however, Vesper did not reach the French top 10 but managed to sell 76,366 tickets, for an average of 256 tickets per copy, and went on to sell 36,552 tickets in its second week. After seven weeks, it sold a cumulative 137,533 tickets.

Critical response
 On Metacritic, the film has a weighted average score of 57 out of 100, based on 10 critics, indicating "mixed or average reviews".

Olivier Delcroix, writing for Le Figaro, found the film "the result of a string of carefully thought through choices, a very beautiful immersive movie that resembles a strange sci-fi fable, fascinating and otherwordly." Philippe Guedj of Le Point found "influences from Cronenberg, Giger, Jim Henson or even Miyazaki", with "the movie zigzagging between a Grimm fairytale mood and a hyperreal painting of a medieval future."

Ben Croll of TheWrap deemed the film "something wholly unique—at once modern and timeless, nostalgic for a genre only just created, already pining for images freshly cast up on screen." Robert Daniels, writing for RogerEbert.com, remarked that "you'd think someone like Vesper who's experienced so much tragedy and misfortune would carry at least a twinge of bitterness or some flaw", but wrote that "[t]he major draw of Vesper, however, is the imaginative world building by Buozyte and Samper." Guy Lodge of Variety described it as "a sci-fi film fascinated by earthly survival, not sleek, state-of-the-art spectacle—though it often dazzles just the same", and praised "the sophisticated technical realization of this desperate dystopia..." "...achieved on a budget presumably a fraction of that granted to most franchised Hollywood fantasies". Writing for New Scientist, Davide Abbatescianni labelled it an "exquisite dystopian sci-fi" with "a Brothers Grimm edge" as well as "a good example of what European science fiction has to offer."

Screen Rant rated it a 3-star out of 5. The header summary stated: "Two elements — the design-driven worldbuilding and Vesper’s development — keep viewers engaged, but they have to overcome a few weaknesses to do so."

See also 
 List of French films of 2022

References

External links
 

2022 science fiction films
2020s dystopian films
2020s English-language films
2020s French films
Belgian science fiction films
English-language Belgian films
English-language French films
English-language Lithuanian films
Films set in the future
Films shot in Lithuania
French post-apocalyptic films
French science fiction films
Lithuanian science fiction films